Reducción de Nuestra Señora de Loreto (Reduction of Our Lady of Laurel), founded in 1610, was the first reductions established by the Jesuits in the Province of Paraguay in the Americas during the Spanish colonial period. The site is located in the Candelaria Department of Misiones Province, Argentina.

The Jesuits learned Indian languages and developed ways to write them using the Roman alphabet. They established a printing press at this mission, for which it became renowned. Not only did the Jesuits print works in Spanish and Latin (the language of the Catholic liturgy, Bible and prayer book), but they translated the Bible and other Christian works into Indian languages, as well as printing dictionaries.

Father Antonio Garriga was a Spanish Jesuit attached to Nuestra Señora de Loreto beginning in the last years of the 17th century and extending well into the early 18th century. He was particularly known as a linguist and missionary to the Moro people; he worked in the region from 1696 and served as Superior of the Mission several times. His book, Practical Instruction to Order One’s Life According to Saintly Precepts (c.1713) was the second oldest book printed at the mission. In 1760, a ship named after the reduction was built by a Filipino in Baja California.

Today only the ruins of the Jesuit reduction are left at the site. In 1984 it was one of four reducciones in Argentina (others were San Ignacio Mini, Nuestra Señora de Santa Ana, and Santa María la Mayor) and São Miguel das Missões in Brazil designated as World Heritage Sites by UNESCO. In 1993 UNESCO added two missions of the Province of Paraguay, located in present-day Paraguay, as World Heritage Sites.

Vegetation has grown over and contributed to deterioration of the ruins, which are not as well preserved as those of San Ignacio Miní, also in Misiones.

See also
 List of Jesuit sites

References 

Jesuit Missions of the Guaranis
Spanish missions in Argentina
Buildings and structures in Misiones Province
Former populated places in Argentina
1610 establishments in the Viceroyalty of Peru 
World Heritage Sites in Argentina